Usman Zamnagawa Dan Shekarau, known as Usman Zamnagawa (also spelled Osumanu Zamnagawa) was the King of Kano from 1343 to 1349.

Ascension and reign 
Usman became King after he usurped his half-brother Tsamiya and murdered him, which earned him the epithet "Zamnagawa". His reign was characterized by peace throughout the land. At the behest of the Rumawa whose town had become populated and prosperous, he made his son "Sarkin Rumawa". He ruled for seven years and was succeeded by his nephew, Ali Yaji Dan Tsamiya.

Biography in the Kano Chronicle
Below is a full biography of Usman Zamnagawa from Palmer's 1908 English translation of the Kano Chronicle.

References 

Monarchs of Kano
14th-century monarchs in Africa